Pandit Sundarlal Sharma (Open) University Chhattisgarh, Bilaspur (PSSOU) is a state university located in Bilaspur, Chhattisgarh, India. It is a state open university offering distance education.

History 

Pandit Sundarlal Sharma (Open) University (PSSOU) Chhattisgarh, Bilaspur was established by the Chhattisgarh legislature in the 55th year of the republic of India under. The Pandit Sundarlal Sharma (Open) University Chhattisgarh Act, 2004.  It was named after Sundarlal Sharma, a freedom and social justice fighter of the Chhattisgarh region. Dr. T.D. Sharma joined this university as the first Vice-Chancellor on 2 March 2005 while Dr. Sharad Kumar Vajpai takes office as Registrar on 15 March 2005. Dr. B. G. Singh was reappointed VC of the university for another term.

The university was formally inaugurated by the former Vice Prime Minister, Govt. of India and Leader of Opposition in Lok Sabha, Shri Lal Krishna Advani at a function presided over by the honorable Chief Minister of Chhattisgarh Dr. Raman Singh attended by Shri Ajay Chandrakar (Minister of Higher Education), Shri Amar Agrawal (Minister of Finance) along with large number of dignitaries and guests.

Faculties and Regional Centres 
The university is structured into the following faculties:

 Faculty of Arts ( Department of English, Hindi, Library Science )
 Faculty of Science and Technology
 Faculty of Social Science(Political Science, Public Administration, Sociology, Social Work etc. )
 Faculty of Commerce
 Faculty of Education
 Faculty of Computer Science (DCA, PGDCA, and BCA)
 Faculty of Yoga, Jyotish and Vastu

 Regional centres were established at Bilaspur, Raipur, Ambikapur, Durg, Jashpur and Jagdalpur.

Administration 
The university is administrated by an Executive Council, Academic Council, Planning Board, Departments, Board of Studies and the Finance Committee. The present Vice Chancellor is Dr. B.G. Singh and Dr. Indu Anant is Registrar.

Executive Council of the University 

 Dr B G Singh, Vice Chancellor/Chairman
 Prof. Jitendra Kumar Srivastava, Member
 Mr. Sant Kumar Netam, Member
 Mr. Gulab Kamro, Member
 Smt. Raj Laxmi Selat, Member
 Mr. S. L. Nayak, Member
 Mr. M. D. Deewan, Member
 Dr. Prafull Sharma, Member
 Mr. Uchit Sood, Member
 Dr. Swami G. C. D. Bharti, Member
 Dr. Jaipal Singh Prajapati, Member
 Dr. (Smt.) Indu Anant, Secretary

References

External links 
 Pandit Sundarlal Sharma (Open) University Chhattisgarh

Open universities in India
Universities and colleges in Chhattisgarh
Education in Bilaspur, Chhattisgarh
Educational institutions established in 2005
2005 establishments in Chhattisgarh